Bernard Voyer,  (born March 7, 1953) is a French Canadian explorer and mountaineer.

Born in Rimouski, Quebec, he has skied across Ellesmere Island; travelled to the North Pole in 1994 and South Pole in 1996; climbed Mount Everest in 1999 and Mount Fuji in 2004. He has also completed The Explorers Grand Slam.

In 1997, he was made a Knight of the National Order of Quebec. In 2001, he was made an Officer of the Order of Canada. In 2000, he was awarded the Gold Medal of the Royal Canadian Geographical Society. In 2001, he was awarded an honorary PhD in Geography from Laurentian University in Sudbury, Ontario.

Honours

 2015 : Meritorious Service Medal (Military Division)
 2012 : Queen Elizabeth II Diamond Jubilee Medal
 2008 : Honorary Lieutenant Colonel 2nd Canadian Ranger Patrol Group 
 2007 : Knight of the French Legion of Honour
 2002 : Queen Elizabeth II Golden Jubilee Medal
 2001 : Officier of the Order of Canada
 1997 : Knight of the Ordre nationale du Québec

References

External links
 Official site

1953 births
Canadian mountain climbers
French Quebecers
Knights of the National Order of Quebec
Living people
Officers of the Order of Canada
People from Rimouski
Sportspeople from Quebec